Suleiman Mohammed Abdul-Hamid Khater (Arabic سليمان خاطر, also transcribed Soleiman, Sulaiman, Sulayman, Suliman etc.; 1961-1986) was an Egyptian soldier who committed the Ras Burqa massacre of October 5, 1985, when he opened fire on Israeli tourists in the Sinai Peninsula, killing seven of them, as well as an Egyptian police officer. While Israel demanded that he be harshly punished, he enjoyed widespread support in Egypt and throughout the Arab world for his actions. Khater was found dead in January 1986, hanged in his jail cell, and the cause of his death was officially determined to be suicide. Many suspected that the Egyptian authorities killed him and staged a "suicide" as a convenient escape from their political dilemma.

Early life 
Suleiman Khater was born in 1961 in the village of Ekyad (sometimes transcribed Akyad) in Al-Sharkeyya governorate, Egypt. He was the youngest of three boys and two girls. During his childhood, Khater witnessed the Israeli strike on Bahr el-Bakar Primary School on April 8, 1970.

In adulthood, Khater joined the Egyptian Central Security Forces as part of his mandatory national service. He also began studying law at Zagazig University through a distance education program.

Ras Burqa massacre 

According to the Associated Press report published by the Pittsburgh Press, on October 5, 1985, Khater, a policeman, shot and killed 7 Israeli tourists, including four children and two women, approximately 25 miles from the Egyptian-Israeli Border. Khater wounded two other minors, one aged 5. The shooting occurred in the late afternoon near a resort.

Court-martial 
Khater's lawyer requested that the trial be held in civil court, but his request was refused. He was court-martialed, found guilty, and sentenced to life in prison with hard labor on December 28, 1985. He was sent to the Military Prison in Cairo to begin serving his sentence. Khater committed suicide on January 7, 1986, less than two weeks into his life term. He was found hanged in his cell.

Public support

Khater's sentence was opposed by public pressure created by the Wafd party, the main opposition party in Egypt at that time. Its newspaper, "Al-Wafd", published a fake story, claiming that the  dead tourists were Israeli soldiers who had crossed the Egyptian border and attacked Khater's post. While pro-government newspapers were silent over the incident, opposition newspapers ran articles praising Khater, hailing him as the hero of Sinai. The opposition press ran various articles attempting to justify his actions, including that the Israeli tourists were spies caught photographing secret military installations, that they spat on and tore up an Egyptian flag, that half-naked Israeli women offended the religiously observant Khater, or that the tourists attacked him. When Khater's trial opened, a wave of protest rallies took place throughout Egypt, and some 140 people were arrested, most of them at Zagazig University, where Khater had been a law student. Several thousand people reportedly attended a Cairo rally protesting his trial. Egypt's most prominent lawyers stood in line to passionately defend Khater. Afterwards, the pro-government press published the real story behind the massacre for the first time, revealing that most of the victims were in fact women and children.

The glorification of Khater in the Egyptian media was echoed in other Arab countries, where many hailed him as a hero and role model. Mass demonstrations were held in his support, and he was honored by the Parliament of Kuwait. In addition, the Iranian government of Ayatollah Khomeini issued a postage stamp reading "In honour of the martyrdom of Sulayman Khater, Hero of Sinai" and named a street in Tehran for him.

Investigation 
In the investigation record, Khater tells his story that on October 5, 1985:

Controversy 
After several wars between Egypt and Israel, and a high death toll, Khater was considered a national hero by the public in Egypt, who believed the Al-Wafd paper story about the 12 Israeli soldiers who attacked Khater and were killed. With a limited access to international media at the pre-Internet era, and under the Mubarak dictatorship, Egyptians continue to believe the conspiracy theory about the suicide of Khater. Many Egyptians cast doubt on the government's version of his death.

The forensic report said that he committed suicide, his family disagreed and refused to believe it. Suicide in Egyptian culture is not a common behavior, and the family of a person who committed suicide can get shunned by the community. His brother said: “I raised my brother very well, and I know how faithful and religious he is. He cannot have committed suicide. They killed him in his prison”.

National (governmental) journals said that Khater hanged himself from a window 3 meters from the ground

Khater's family issued a request to have the autopsy redone by an independent committee, however their request was declined. As soon as Khater's death was announced, angry university and school students protested. His mother later said: “My son was killed, by the government, for the sake of America and Israel, so that they will be satisfied”.

In popular culture 
In 2018, two years after its first debut in Alexandria, an Egyptian play under the name of Khater was performed onstage in the Egyptian Shooting club and Cairo Sporting club. In response, Egypt's military prosecution decided to arrest and investigate the playwright and director of the play as well as other officials who gave permission for the theatrical show. They were charged with "insulting the Egyptian military".

References

External links 
 NewsFilm Online: Egypt: Death of Policeman Conscript who Killed Israelis leads to Anti-government Demonstrations
 The Milwaukee Journal: Egyptian killer of seven Israelis commits suicide in his cell

1961 births
1986 deaths
Deaths by hanging
Egyptian military personnel
Egyptian mass murderers
Egyptian murderers of children
Egypt–Israel relations
People from Sharqia Governorate
People who were court-martialed